Runan County is a county under the administration of the prefecture-level city of Zhumadian, in the southeast of Henan Province, China.

History

In ancient times, this area was called "the middle of the world", since it was the center of government for Yu province and lay at the heart of the Nine Provinces. The Duke of Zhou, the most influential statesman of the early Zhou dynasty, visited Runan many times and termed it as the center of the land. During the Han dynasty, it contributed the most officials to the central government of any commandery, and was ancestral home to the immensely influential Ru'nan Yuan clan. In former times Runan County was at various times called Ancheng County and Ruyang County, and Caizhou., amongst others. During the Zhou dynasty (1,045-256 BC), the vassal State of Dao fell within the borders of the county.

The town was the site of a major battle, the siege of Caizhou, in the war between the Mongol Empire and Jurchen Jin dynasty. Emperor Aizong, the Jurchen ruler, had fled to Caizhou after the Jin capital of Kaifeng was captured by the Mongols. He committed suicide in Caizhou and his successor, Emperor Mo, was killed in the besieged town. The Jin dynasty ended in Runan in 1234.

Administrative divisions
Today Runan County falls under the jurisdiction of the prefecture level city of Zhumadian. With a land area of 1306 square kilometres, the county is home to some 770,000 people (2002 figure). The county government is based in the town of Runing (Juning). The county of Runan was far larger in Chinese history, but had to surrender a lot of its territories to the nearby city of Zhumadian and counties in the recent centuries. This means that today's Runan is much smaller than it was.

Since Runan was famous in Chinese history, many historical relics still could be found in the county seat and within its county boundary. Notably, the Nanhai Chan Temple is famous in the Buddhist world. The site where the Duke of Zhou visited became a historical site as well.

As 2017, this county is divided to 4 subdistricts, 12 towns and 2 townships.

Subdistricts

Towns

Townships 
Nanyudian Township
Bandian Township

Climate

References 

 
County-level divisions of Henan
Zhumadian